Kaiwharawhara is an urban seaside suburb of Wellington in New Zealand's North Island. It is located north of the centre of the city on the western shore of Wellington Harbour, where the Kaiwharawhara Stream reaches the sea from its headwaters in Karori. It is a largely commercial and industrial area and thus has little residential population. A recent housing development up the hillside towards Te Kainga has increased the resident population.

Kaiwharawhara contains some major transport infrastructure. Both State Highway 1 and the North Island Main Trunk railway pass through Kaiwharawhara on their routes from central Wellington northwards. Due to its waterfront location, Kaiwharawhara also has shipping activity, with the Wellington Interislander Ferry terminal located on the boundary of Kaiwharawhara and Pipitea.

Kaiwharawhara Railway Station was closed in 2013, and the suburb is now served by buses. Just north of the station the Wairarapa Line (including the commuter Hutt Valley Line) diverges from the North Island Main Trunk railway.

In sport, Kaiwharawhara was previously represented in soccer by Waterside, a club formed by dock workers in 1921. In 1988, they merged with the Karori Swifts to form Waterside Karori AFC.

Etymology and history
The area has always been known to Māori as Kaiwharawhara, which is Māori for 'food' (kai) and 'the fruit of the Astelia (wharawhara). Jerningham Wakefield during the 1840s commented that the stream was called after the "wharrawharra", and from this, the name was corrupted in European usage to Kaiwarra. The suburb (and the station) name was corrected from Kaiwarra to Kaiwharawhara from 9 February 1951 by a decision of the New Zealand Geographic Board.

The Old Porirua Road went up the Ngaio Gorge to Ngaio and Porirua.

From 1890 Kaiwharawhara was part of the Borough of Onslow until the borough amalgamated with Wellington City in 1919.

Factories in the area included John Newton's Caledonian soap works from the 1880s to the 1960s, Charles Schultze's flourmill and Hirst's tannery. William Cable & Company had a foundry. The NEECO factory in the 20th century produced electric stoves for state houses and thousands of Army items like steel water bottles in World War II. From the 1927 the Gorge area had large tanks for Atlantic Oil's bulk petrol storage, in a former quarry, which had been the source of fill for harbour reclamation in the 1870s. There was a major leak from a pipe at the depot, which polluted much of the harbour in 1967.

The railways started construction of railway houses for staff at the Kaiwharawhara Settlement in 1920, within two miles of the busiest railway yard ... .

Toll-gate

A toll-gate was established at Kaiwharawhara by the Hutt County Council. It caught all vehicular and other traffic in and out of Wellington and made a substantial charge for the maintenance of roads. Hutt County ran from Cook Strait to Waikanae and the Rimutakas and the money was spent on road improvements that gave little or no benefit to Wellington residents. The toll-gate was removed when Kaiwharawhara joined the Borough of Onslow in 1890. The Hutt County set up new gates on the Hutt Road and Ngauranga Gorge.

Demographics
Kaiwharawhara is part of the Pipitea-Kaiwharawhara statistical area.

Further reading

External links

References

Suburbs of Wellington City
Populated places around the Wellington Harbour